Bashorun Olalekan is a Nigerian academic who served as the seventh provost of Adeniran Ogunsanya College of Education.

Education and career
In 1984, Bashorun graduated from Virginia State University, Petersburg with a B.Sc certificate in Agricultural Business & Economics. He went on to obtain his M.Sc certificate from the same university.

Bashorun was employed by Adeniran Ogunsanya College of Education on 5 January 1998 as a senior lecturer in the Department of Agricultural Education. Between 1999 - 2004, he was the Head of Department of Agricultural Education Department and acting Dean, School of Vocational and Technical Education between 2002 - 2003. On 1 October 2004, he was promoted to the position of Chief Lecturer and went on to be elected Dean of School of Vocational and Technical Education in 2006.

References

Virginia State University alumni
Academic staff of Adeniran Ogunsanya College of Education